Arthur Allen Jones (November 22, 1926 – August 28, 2007) was the founder of Nautilus, Inc. and MedX, Inc. and the inventor of the Nautilus exercise machines, including the Nautilus pullover, which was first sold in 1970. Jones was a pioneer in the field of physical exercise i.e. weight and strength training. He was born in Arkansas, and grew up in Seminole, Oklahoma.

Accomplishments
Jones's ideas tried to move the public's notion of bodybuilding and strength-training exercise away from the Arnold Schwarzenegger school of training, which involved hours in the gym using free weights, to high intensity training. This involves short, single sets, with each set taken to the point of complete muscular failure with a frequency of once or at most twice a week with the intention to maximize muscular hypertrophy and strength increases. Famous individuals who trained under Jones's supervision include Casey Viator (who participated in the Colorado Experiment), Eddie Robinson (who worked with and participated in and trained under Jones's Nautilus leverage line, which is now Hammer Strength, IFBB professional body builders Mike and Ray Mentzer (both won the Mr. America IFBB and AAU respectively), Sergio Oliva (winner of every major bodybuilding contest and was also the only individual to win the Mr. Olympia over Arnold Schwarzenegger who placed 2nd) and Boyer Coe (Mr. America, Mr.International, Mr.Universe etc.)

Jones's publications included the Nautilus Bulletins, which dispelled contemporary myths of exercise and resistance training. He also wrote and published "The Cervical Spine, Lumbar Spine And The Knee," which provided for the first time a complete description of the function of the lumbar spine and its true range of motion.

Additional publications included the results of Jones's studies on the differing responses of muscular structures exposed to varying amounts of exercise throughout limited and unlimited range of motion. Jones labeled these responses as type S response for specific and type G for general. He was among the first researchers to experiment with exclusively eccentric training on test subjects and among the first to suggest the superiority and importance of eccentric training for strength. He was the inventor of infimetric and akinetic exercise equipment. He was the first exercise machine designer to utilize cams, as opposed to pulleys, in exercise machines, making possible for the first time resistance that varied along the force curves generated by human muscular structures.

It was the advent of Nautilus machines that made resistance training appealing to the general public, fueling the fitness boom of the 1970s and 80s and resulting in Nautilus gyms in strip malls across America.

Nautilus, Inc. markets the Bowflex, Stairmaster and Nautilus product lines. These new product lines are not affiliated with Jones. The Bowflex "power rod" bending technology is in part based on Jones's ideas due to its use of variable resistance.

The Nautilus machines and the company he formed to sell them made Jones a multimillionaire and landed him on the Forbes list of the 400 richest people. At one point, financial analysts estimated that Nautilus was grossing $400 million annually. He sold Nautilus Inc. in 1986 for $23 million. He also sold MedX Corporation in 1996 and then retired.

On August 28, 2007, Jones died from natural causes at his home in Ocala, Florida, at age 80. He was survived by two daughters and by two sons, Gary and William Edgar Jones. Gary Jones created Hammer Strength strength training machines.

Inventions 
Arthur Jones was a prolific inventor, holding numerous patents (many of which were assigned to Nautilus or MedX), most notably the elliptical cam (which replaces the pulley) to provide variable resistance through the range of motion.

Other interests
Jones often prided himself on being a generalist, something which he describes as a move away from the stubbornness and short-sightedness of 'specialists'. He attributed this in part to his upbringing in a family of physicians, as he found their attitudes toward medicine revolved around what they were taught and nothing else. One of his favorite quotes was Robert A. Heinlein's "specialization is for insects." He often cited that his observations gained from flying allowed him to understand the requirements for developing exercise machines. He believed in the competent man, that, as Heinlein also said, "a man should be able to put food on the table, build a house, tan a hide and deliver a baby."

Jones traveled and 'adventured' widely, occasionally with friend and fellow adventurer Roy Pinney (Jones's cameraman for a syndicated TV series called Wild Cargo), setting up camp for two years or so at a time in different places such as Rhodesia (now Zimbabwe) and Mexico City. His motto was "younger women, faster airplanes, and bigger crocodiles." Jones's Lake Helen, Florida, Nautilus building was the home of Gomek, an 18-foot salt water crocodile that Jones was trying to grow to world record size.  He was also an aficionado of venomous spiders and reptiles, a large collection of which was also housed in the Nautilus building. He ran a business that involved the importation of a variety of wild animals, ranging from tropical fish to snakes, parrots and monkeys. Jones's household included a jaguar named "Gaylord" that had free run of the house and even slept on the bed with his daughter. He once retrofitted several of his jumbo jets in order to transport 63 baby elephants, that had been orphaned in Africa, to his Jumbo Lair compound in Florida. Jones filmed the entire operation for television and entitled it Operation Elephant.

He once appeared on the Tonight Show with his wife Terri and presented Johnny Carson with a rhino horn and explained to Carson that drinking ground-up rhino horn was an aphrodisiac.

Jones was the creator of the "Jumbolair" estate, originally created as a haven of 350 acres (1.4 km2) for orphaned African elephants and other wildlife. He also kept two rhinos and a 600 lb male silverback gorilla that he named Mickey on the Jumbo Lair compound.

After WWII, he developed and owned a zoo in Slidell, Louisiana.

Jones was an accomplished pilot, which was especially useful for the animal import-export businesses that he ran prior to the founding of Nautilus Sports Medical Industry.

He also founded MedX Corporation, in which he invested 120 million dollars, to develop medical-based exercise and testing equipment for the cervical spine, lumbar spine and the knee.

In 1962, he wrote, produced, and directed the movie Voodoo Swamp.

References

Sources

 "In Florida's horse country, a community with jet appeal: Jumbolair", reprinted from the Associated Press.
 "In Conversation with Arthur Jones", by Brian D. Johnston
 Interview with Arthur Jones
 "Muscle Man" (Time) by Stephen Koepp
 Arthur Jones famous bulletin about HIT training

External links

  New York Times Obituary
 Arthur Jones' written works free online
 Arthur Jones online museum (subscription required)
 Link to pdf on "long overdue academic recognition" of Jones' contribution to the field of exercise physiology
 Jumbolair website
 MedX Corporation website
 Nautilus, Inc. website
  Link to partial bio of Nautilus, as written by Arthurs' son W E Jones
 Nautilus Bulletin Number 1
 Nautilus Bulletin Number 2
 Link to pictures and videos of Arthur Jones

1926 births
2007 deaths
20th-century American inventors
People associated with physical culture
People from Ocala, Florida
People from Seminole, Oklahoma
Inventors from Arkansas